Oligarrhena is a genus of flowering plants belonging to the family Ericaceae.

Its native range is Western Australia.

Species:
 Oligarrhena micrantha R.Br.

References

Epacridoideae
Ericaceae genera